Franz Jägerstätter, O.F.S. (also spelled Jaegerstaetter in English; born Franz Huber, 20 May 1907 – 9 August 1943) was an Austrian conscientious objector during World War II. Jägerstätter was sentenced to death and executed for his refusal to fight for Nazi Germany. He was later declared a martyr and beatified by the Catholic Church.

Life

Jägerstätter was born in Sankt Radegund, Upper Austria, a small village between Salzburg and Braunau am Inn where nearly everyone was Catholic. He was the child of Rosalia Huber, a chambermaid, and Franz Bachmeier, a farmer. As his parents could not afford a marriage, Franz was first cared for by his grandmother, Elisabeth Huber, who had a reputation as an exceptionally devout woman. His biological father was killed in World War I in 1915, when Franz was seven or eight years old. In 1917, his mother married Heinrich Jägerstätter. As the marriage produced no children of Jägerstätter's own, he adopted his wife's son and gave over the farm to him after Franz married in 1936.

As a boy, Franz was a better than average student and an avid reader, apparently leaving school after his 14th birthday, as permitted by law. His fellow villagers remembered the Franz of early manhood fondly as "a jolly, robust, fun-loving, hot-blooded, 'he-man' type," intelligent and "bull-headed," who tended to be "ahead of the crowd" in his interests and to wish to be the first to try something new; he was the first in his village to own a motorcycle. While he was not irreligious in his youth and regularly went to Mass, there was nothing to foreshadow the devotion he was known for in later years, and he once embarrassed the pastor of the village by asking him about the possibility that the Virgin Mary had other children after Jesus. The young Franz was also remembered as a good fighter who was involved many times in gang violence. On one occasion, he spent several days in jail as a consequence of a fight with members of the Heimwehr provoked by the attention paid by members of the group to local girls.

In August 1933, an illegitimate daughter, Hildegard, was born to Jägerstätter and a local farm maidservant, Theresia Auer. Although some friends expressed doubts about Jägerstätter's paternity of the girl, he voluntarily paid money for her support and visited her often. Perhaps due to circumstances related to the girl's conception, Jägerstätter apparently underwent an "exile" around this time during which he was obliged to leave Sankt Radegund for several years, working in the iron mines of Eisenerz.

In the mid-1930s, Jägerstätter made a turn towards morality and religion that most of his neighbours recalled as "so sudden that people just couldn't understand it," "almost as if he had been possessed by a higher power," although others described it as more gradual. On Maundy Thursday (9 April) of 1936, he married Franziska Schwaninger (04 March 1913 - 16 March 2013), a deeply religious woman. After the wedding liturgy, the couple proceeded on a pilgrimage to Rome, where they received a blessing from Pope Pius XI. Most members of the community attributed Jägerstätter's conversion to his wife's influence or the sight of the pope, but other evidence indicates that his choice of a wife and decision to travel to Rome may have rather been influenced by a conversion that had already taken place; one friend recalled that he observed Jägerstätter had already become much more religious when he returned from the iron mines in late 1934 or 1935. The marriage produced three daughters: Rosalia (b. 1 September 1937), Maria (b. 4 September 1938), and Aloisia (b. 5 May 1940).

When German troops moved into Austria in March 1938, Jägerstätter rejected the offered position as Radegund mayor. He was the only person in the village to vote against the Anschluss in the plebiscite of 10 April; nevertheless, the local authorities suppressed his dissent and announced unanimous approval. He was dismayed to witness many Catholics in his town supporting the Nazis, writing, "I believe there could scarcely be a sadder hour for the true Christian faith in our country". Although he was not involved with any political organization and underwent a brief period of military training, he remained openly anti-Nazi. On 8 December 1940, he joined the Third Order of Saint Francis and from summer 1941 worked as a sacristan at the local parish church, being deferred from military service four times. 

Drafted for the first time on 17 June 1940, Jägerstätter, aged 33, was again conscripted into the German Wehrmacht in October and completed his training at the Enns garrison. He refused to take the Hitler oath, but could return home in 1941 under an exemption as a farmer. Faced with his experiences in military service, the suppression of the church, as well as reports on the Nazi T4 "euthanasia" program, he began to examine the morality of the war. He even proceeded to Linz to discuss this with his bishop but emerged from the conversation saddened that the episcopate seemed afraid to confront the issues.

Arrest and death

After many delays, Jägerstätter was finally called to active duty on 9 February 1943. By this time, he had three daughters with his wife, the eldest not quite six. He maintained his position against fighting for Nazi Germany and, upon entering into the Wehrmacht garrison in Enns on 1 March, declared his conscientious objection. His offer to serve as a medic was ignored. He was immediately arrested and placed in custody, first at the Linz remand prison, then from 4 May at Berlin-Tegel. A priest from his village visited him in jail and tried to talk him into serving, but did not succeed. When he heard of the fate of the Austrian priest Father Franz Reinisch, who had been executed for his refusal to take the Hitler oath, he was determined to go the same way.

Accused of Wehrkraftzersetzung (undermining military morale), Jägerstätter was sentenced to death for sedition in a military trial at the Reichskriegsgericht in Berlin-Charlottenburg on 6 July 1943. He was deported to Brandenburg-Görden Prison on 9 August, where he was executed by guillotine that afternoon, at age 36. Minutes before his execution, he was given the option to sign a document to save his life and declined, abjuring any complicity with the Nazi regime. Jägerstätter's last recorded words before his death were, "I am completely bound in inner union with the Lord". After the war, in 1946, his ashes were buried at the Sankt Radegund cemetery.

Legacy and beatification
Jägerstätter was criticized by his countrymen, especially by those who had served in the military, for failing in his duty as a husband and father. The municipality of Sankt Radegund at first refused to put his name on the local war memorial and a pension for his widow was not approved until 1950.

Jägerstätter's fate was not well known until 1964, when US sociologist Gordon Zahn published his biography, In Solitary Witness. Thomas Merton, the famed Trappist monk and peace activist, included a chapter about Jägerstätter in his book Faith and Violence (1968). A 1971 film treatment of his life made for Austrian television, Verweigerung ("The Refusal") (originally titled Der Fall Jägerstätter), by director Axel Corti, starred Kurt Weinzierl. A bronze plaque with his quotation about conscientious objection was dedicated at the Pacifist Memorial in Sherborn, Massachusetts, in 1994. His case was a topic of the annual Braunauer Zeitgeschichte-Tage conference in 1995. The death sentence was nullified by the Landgericht Berlin on 7 May 1997. A Stolperstein for Jägerstätter in Sankt Radegund was laid in 2006.

In June 2007, Pope Benedict XVI issued an apostolic exhortation declaring Jägerstätter a martyr. On 26 October 2007, he was beatified in a ceremony held by Cardinal José Saraiva Martins at the New Cathedral in Linz. His feast day is the day of his baptism, 21 May.

The documentary Franz Jaegerstaetter: A Man of Conscience was released in 2011.

A film about Jägerstätter, A Hidden Life, written and directed by Terrence Malick, premiered in May 2019 at the 72nd Cannes Film Festival, and was given a general release in the US on 13 December 2019. The film is inspired by the book Franz Jägerstätter: Letters and Writings from Prison, edited by biographer Erna Putz, with Malick acquiring its adaptation rights for the production.

References

Bibliography

Andreas Maislinger, Franz Jägerstätter. In: Conquering the Past. Austrian Nazism Yesterday & Today. Edited by Fred Parkinson. Wayne State University Press, Detroit 1989.
Andreas Maislinger, Franz Jägerstätter and Leopold Engleitner. In: Bernhard Rammerstorfer, Unbroken Will. The Extraordinary Courage of an Ordinary Man. The Story of Leopold Engleitner. Grammaton Press. New Orleans 2004.

External links

 "The Refusal" a story of Franz Jägerstätter, a semi-documentary filmed in black-and-white in German with English subtitles alternating dramatizations with actual interviews with Jägerstätter's wife, priest, and other villagers, Der Fall Jägerstätter (1971)
 Born between Salzburg and Braunau am Inn
 Franz Jägerstätter and Leopold Engleitner
 Bl. Franz Jägerstätter (1907–1943) Biography by the Holy See
 Site about Jägerstätter – in German, with some English translations
 Franz Jägerstätter: a solitary witness

1907 births
1943 deaths
Austrian anti-fascists
Austrian beatified people
Austrian Christian pacifists
Austrian conscientious objectors
Austrian people executed by Nazi Germany
Austrian resistance members
Beatifications by Pope Benedict XVI
Catholic saints and blesseds of the Nazi era
Executed Austrian people
Executed German Resistance members
Franciscan beatified people
Franciscan martyrs
Members of the Third Order of Saint Francis
People who were court-martialed
People executed by Nazi Germany by guillotine
People from Braunau am Inn District
Secular Franciscans
Lists of stolpersteine in Germany